The Square Montholon is a square in the 9th arrondissement of Paris, France.

Construction of the 4571 m2 square began in 1862, costing 160,000 francs, at the time of building of Rue Lafayette, and opened in 1863.

The square comprises two terraces and is encircled by a Louis-Philippe-style fence. The central grass garden is home to two hundred-year-old 30 m tall oriental plane trees as well a marble statuary group by Julien Lorieux dedicated to the young working women of the quarter.

A fountain with a bronze sculpture, “The Bear, the Eagle and the Vulture”, was removed and melted down in 1941 or 1942, during the Nazi occupation of Paris.

References

Montholon
Buildings and structures in the 9th arrondissement of Paris